Frederik Stang (4 March 1808 – 8 June 1884) was a Norwegian lawyer, public servant, and politician who served as Norway's 1st prime minister in Christiana.

Stang was born on the Nordre Rostad farm at Stokke in Vestfold, Norway. He was the son of Lauritz Leganger Stang (1775–1836) and Johanne  Margrethe Conradi (1780–1820). His father was a procurator and later a magistrate.  At age 13, he entered the Bergen Cathedral School. Stang, known as Friederich until the 1830s, entered the study of law at the age of 16 and  passed the bar exam in 1828.

In 1830, he accepted a position as lecturer of law at the University of Oslo.  During this time, he published a seminal text on Norwegian constitutional law.  He went over to private practice in 1834, where he distinguished himself as a trial attorney, especially in supreme court cases.

In 1846, Stang became the most senior civil servant in the newly formed (and no longer existent) Domestic Ministry.  He served in this position until 1856, and his tenure was characterized by tireless efforts to modernize Norway's economic infrastructure.  In addition to improving the road network, harbors, canals, and lighthouses, he was in great measure responsible for Norway and Scandinavia's first railroad, from Oslo to Eidsvoll.  He also worked hard to elevate the importance and function of agriculture in Norway, initiating the formation of a university-level school of agriculture, commissioned travelling agrarians, and encouraged better breeding among Norwegian farm animals.
In 1861, after a brief stint as mayor of Oslo, Stang was appointed to the Norwegian cabinet. His time as a political leader was characterized by considerable discord within the Norwegian parliament and between Norway and the Swedish government. In 1865, Stang founded the Norwegian Red Cross. In 1870, he was elected a member of the Royal Swedish Academy of Sciences.

Until 1873, the king of the personal union between Sweden and Norway governed Norway through two cabinets: one in Stockholm and another, led by a viceroy in Kristiania, now Oslo.  After the viceroy position had been vacant for some time, the post of prime minister for Norway was instituted in 1873, and Stang was appointed.  Although there was also a prime minister in Stockholm, the one in Norway had the most influence over state affairs. In spite of efforts to reconcile opposing political forces, his party was reduced to a minority position during his tenure. In a gesture of spite, the parliament cut his pension in half in 1881; the citizens of Oslo raised money to make up for the shortfall, and he donated this to a foundation to advance the study of law.

Personal life
He was married in 1833 with Augusta Julie Georgine von Munthe af Morgenstierne (1812-1885), the daughter of Magistrate Bredo von Munthe af Morgenstierne (1774-1835) and Cathrine Elisabeth Fries (1781-1840). They were the parents of  Emil Stang (1834-1912). 
Frederik Stang's name is often misspelled as Fredrik Stang, which was the name of his grandson Fredrik Stang (1867-1941) who was a noted jurist. He was also the grandfather of Emil Stang (1882-1964) and Fredrik Stang Lund (1859-1922).

Honours and awards
Frederik Stang became a member of The Royal Norwegian Scientific Society in 1846, the Videnskabs-Selskabet in Christiania at its founding in 1857 and the Royal Swedish Academy of Sciences in Stockholm. He was appointed Commander of the Order of St. Olav at its founding in 1847 and was awarded the Grand Cross in 1853. Four years later, he received the highest award in the country, Bürgerverdienstmedallie in gold. He was a Knight of the Swedish Royal Order of the Seraphim and had the Grand Cross of the Order of the Dannebrog and held other foreign orders.

References

1808 births
1884 deaths
People educated at the Bergen Cathedral School
Prime Ministers of Norway
Mayors of Oslo
Academic staff of the Faculty of Law, University of Oslo
Presidents of the Norwegian Red Cross
19th-century Norwegian lawyers
19th-century Norwegian politicians
Members of the Royal Swedish Academy of Sciences
Frederik

Grand Crosses of the Order of the Dannebrog
Attorneys general of Norway